Lepidochrysops fumosa is a butterfly in the family Lycaenidae. It was described by Arthur Gardiner Butler in 1886. It is found in Ethiopia and Somalia.

References

Butterflies described in 1886
fumosa
Butterflies of Africa
Taxa named by Arthur Gardiner Butler